This is an incomplete list of earthquakes in Kosovo. Kosovo is one of the country with relatively high seismic activity in the Balkan Peninsula. In different periods the Kosovo has faced small and large earthquakes. Since the establishment of the Kosovo Seismological Survey in 2008 there have been 901 earthquakes in Kosovo with a magnitude of 1.5 and up to 5.2 on the Richter scale.

References 

Kosovo
earthquakes
Earthquakes